Miguel Gerardo Diego Talamantes, better known as Mikky Lafey, (born 29 November 1988 in Piedras Negras) is a Mexican "philosopher", writer, editor, poet, novelist, illustrator, occultist, producer, television presenter, podcaster and radio personality.

Early life 
Mikky Lafey made his television debut in 2012 in the now defunct magazine program El Café Expresso for SuperMedios of Coahuila, with a brief section called "El Chal" but left shortly after to join the cast of another TV show, Hombres de Marte y Plutón (Men from Mars and Pluto) with Alejandro Wong and Chuy Uresti – both transmitted by the SuperChannel22 channel, improving his notoriety by exposing taboos, sexuality and the friendship between heterosexuals and homosexuals, with a 'radio version' of the show launched in 2014, ending by the mid 2017, transmitted on EXAFM 105.5 (XHRE-FM).

Press 
Acting as interviewer, Lafey has interviewed various personalities from the art world, presenting both on radio and television. First in 2012, on radio, he interviewed Camilo Lara from Mexican Institute of Sound. In 2013, he interviewed Babo of Cartel de Santa, then in 2014, he interviewed Gabriel Montiel Gutiérrez (Werevertumorro), and Erik Canales, the vocalist of the Mexican rock band Allison, just to name a few. In 2015, he obtained an exclusive interview with Mario Bautista, Sebastian Yatra and the Latin Grammy Award-nominated Vázquez Sounds. On 28 February 2018, he made an exclusive interview to ex-t.A.T.u. Lena Katina and was presented on Mikky Lafey On Air by telephone link.

Literary output 

Escritos de Demonios ("Writings of Demons") his debut book with essays and sacred geometry was published on 4 March 2017. In late October 2019, Mikky Lafey was in front of a more considerable audience, according to their profile-page on Facebook dedicated to their second work (and also third because it has 2 editions), he reach more than 21,000 likes, generating a positive response in this social network after waiting for his next work in this interval with his new readers. In the last week of May 2019, his second book of philosophy and occultism called "El Nuevo Testamento Satanista" reach the number 3 on the list of "The 100 best-selling books of Amazon Kindle" and remains there for a week. Then, the author announces that a new release, an "extended version" with the collaboration of Judas Kalid, "El Nuevo Testamento Satanista: El Libro de La Bestia" (The extended edition of "El Desplome de la Pluma") generated now a much greater expectation of how it was in the first edition on 31 October 2018. Mikky Lafey becomes a best seller author and all happened during the presale of his third book, started on 15 April 2019 and until 15 October, during the interval prior to its launch, the book has remained in the top sales in its formats of "ebooks" on Amazon Kindle for more than 5 consecutive months in the categories of "Philosophy of good and evil" in position No. 9 for more than 5 weeks, and then, going to No. 10 in the category of "Paganism and Neo-Paganism" taking position No. 4 of Amazon Kindle platform. Mikky Lafey published his first books using an Alter ego called "Aposento". Sacred geometry is present in almost all of his artworks. In 2020, made a collaboration with an author named Asahel Ivel on a new philosophical novel and Ontology work: Dialéctica del Ser, a Bildungsroman or "coming-of-age story", launched on 1 January 2020, and the second part on 30 April 2020. On 27 June 2020, Lafey launches Rebis: El Estado Primordial, a book about Alchemy, Initiatic philosophy and Hermeticism, for free on digital download in Apple Books, Google Play Books and other platforms, also a physical format was published on the same date exclusive on Amazon.

Writings and books 
 Escritos de Demonios (First Edition) (March-4th-2017).
 El Nuevo Testamento Satanista: El Desplome de la Pluma (First Edition) (31st-October-2018).
 El Árbol de Judas (First Edition) by Judas Kalid (As Editor and illustrator) (April-30th-2019).
 Escritos de Demonios (Special Edition) (July-16-2019).
 El Nuevo Testamento Satanista: El Libro de La Bestia (Extended Edition) (31st-October-2019).
 El Árbol de Judas (Extended Version) by Judas Kalid (Co-producer and illustrator) (31st-October-2019).
 Dialéctica del Ser – Tomo I: Ping with Asahel Ivel (1 January 2020).
 Dialéctica del Ser – Tomo II: Pong with Asahel Ivel (April-30th-2020).
 Rebis: El Estado Primordial (27-June-2020).
 Las luces imperecederas (11-July-2022).

Radio 
 Hombres de Marte y Plutón EXAFM Version (XHRE-FM) (2013–2014)
 Que Fuerte! (2014)
 Los Hijos del Rock, with Vero Diego (2015 – August 2016)
 Desvelados. (2016)
 Rock'n Exa. (2017)
 El Ying y El Yang, with Corey Toledo. (2017)
 La Botana EXActa. (2018–2019)
 Mikky Lafey On Air (XHRE EXAFM 105.5) (2013–2019)
 Almas Descarriadas (XHSL-FM) (2015–August to 2016), (2019–2020)

Television 
 El Café Expresso (2012), (2014)
 Hombres de Marte y Plutón (2012–2014)

Published illustrations & paintings by Lafey
 The 13th Cosmic Collapse, 3 October 2016. 
 Escritos de Demonios (FOB Illustration), ASIN:B06XFZWJRL, 4 March 2017.
 Metáfora – Kechua Diego (EP Artwork), ASIN: B07PNFJ3GS, 23 February 2019.
 El Árbol de Judas (FOB Illustration), ASIN: B07R24MDG8, 30 April 2019.

Bibliography
 de Demonios, Escritos (2017). Mikky Lafey. .
 de Judas, El Árbol (2019). Judas Kalid. .

See also
Ontology
Alchemy
New Age

References

External links

 Official Site
 Official Twitter
 Official Facebook page 
 Mikky Lafey's Instagram

Living people
Mexican non-fiction writers
Mexican male writers
Mexican philosophers
Deist philosophers
Ontologists
Mexican occultists
Mexican radio presenters
Mexican television presenters
1988 births
People from Piedras Negras, Coahuila
Hermeneutists
Philosophers of technology
Philosophers of culture
Mexican deists
Male non-fiction writers
Writers from Coahuila